Aspathines is a genus of opossum beetles in the family Zopheridae. There is at least one described species in Aspathines, A. aeneus.

References

Further reading

 
 
 

Zopheridae
Articles created by Qbugbot